The Optical Inter-orbit Communications Engineering Test Satellite (OICETS), also called Kirari, was an experimental satellite launched by JAXA to demonstrate interorbital communication between satellites through optical (laser) means. OICETS was originally slated for a launch on the second J-I launcher. Due to problems with that launcher, the launch had to be put on hold. Using the H-IIA was out of question: it would have been overkill to use the H-IIA to send a  satellite into low Earth orbit, and there was no budget for another H-IIA launch. Finally, in order to be able to perform the tests during the lifetime of the European Artemis satellite (since 2014, sold to Avanti Communications to exploit its Ka, S, and L-band payloads), OICETS was successfully launched on an SS-18-based Dnepr rocket.

The satellite was decommissioned and its mission terminated on 24 September 2009 at 05:48 UTC.

Achievements
On 9 December 2005, JAXA succeeded in establishing optical links between OICETS and Artemis.
During March 2006, a successful link between OICETS and a ground station in Japan was established. This was the first optical links connection between a fixed ground station and an LEO satellite.
On 7 June 2006, JAXA established a communication link between OICETS and a mobile ground station operated by the German Aerospace Center (DLR).

Notes

External links

 OICETS website at JAXA.jp

Satellites of Japan
Spacecraft launched in 2005
Spacecraft launched by Dnepr rockets
Spacecraft decommissioned in 2009
Technology demonstration satellites